The Circuit de l'Est was a six-stage air race organized by the newspaper  Le Matin,
 which took place in August 1910. General Foch, who had followed the race attentively, declared a few weeks later during the first aerial maneuvers in Picardy, to the Matin delegate, Robert de Beauplan: "All that, you see, is sport: but for the army, the air force, it's zero".

Competition

The race took place over six stages linking the cities of Paris - Troyes -­ Nancy -­ Mézières - Douai ­ Amiens - Paris. The French army aviation service committed three crews to this event.

Alfred Leblanc won the race, and won the prize of 100,000 francs reserved for the winner (i.e. approximately €366,000 in 2017), Émile Aubrun finished second, each piloting a Blériot XI monoplane powered by a Gnome engine of 50hp. They were the only survivors of the 35 entered, of which only ten started from Issy-lès-Moulineaux. They traveled 805 km in 12 h 1 min 1 s, an average speed of 66.99km/h.

References

External links 

1910 in France
Air races
Aviation history of France